This is a list of short wave transmitters in Europe.

Active stations

Former stations
Those are former prominent SW transmitters:

The above radio stations broadcast in the wavebands of 75, 60, 49, 41, 31, 25, 22, 19, 16 and/or 11 meters.

See also
List of shortwave radio broadcasters

External links
http://short-wave.info
http://vcfm.ru
http://aparyshev.ru 
http://freedomrussia.org
http://novosibdx.info
http://kamrc.ru
http://radiostation.ru
http://perunica.ru
http://morehod.ru
https://radiokot.ru

Broadcast transmitters